, third son of Matsudono Motofusa, was a kugyō (high-ranking Japanese official) from the late Heian period to the early Kamakura period.

Though he was not first-born, in 1179 at age of 8 he was promoted to gon-chūnagon, one of Daijō-kan due to the political tension between Emperor Go-Shirakawa and Taira no Kiyomori. However, this caused backlash from Kiyomori, leading to the Jisho coup in the same year.

In 1232, he ordained as a Buddhist monk and took the Dharma name Daishin (大心).

1172 births
1238 deaths
Fujiwara clan
Matsudono family
People of Heian-period Japan
People of Kamakura-period Japan
Kamakura period Buddhist clergy